John Chambers (October 6, 1780 – September 21, 1852) was a U.S. Representative from Kentucky and the second Governor of the Iowa Territory. He was appointed by President William Henry Harrison.

Education & early career
Chambers was born at Bromley Bridge, Somerset County, New Jersey, on October 6, 1780, a son of Roland Chambers (1744–1821) and Phoebe (Mullican) Chambers.

He attended the public schools and the Transylvania Seminary at Lexington, Kentucky. In 1794 he moved with his father to Washington, Mason County, Kentucky. After studying law he was admitted to the bar in 1800 and commenced practice in Washington, Kentucky. He owned slaves.  Chambers served as aide-de-camp to General William Henry Harrison in the War of 1812 and was at the Battle of the Thames.  He served as a member of the Kentucky House of Representatives in 1812, 1815, 1830, and 1831.  In 1825, Chambers was appointed judge of the Kentucky Court of Appeals. He resigned in 1827.

U.S. Congressional career
He was elected as a pro-Adams candidate to the Twentieth Congress to fill the vacancy caused by the resignation of Thomas Metcalfe and served from December 1, 1828, to March 3, 1829; elected as an Anti-Jacksonian to the Twenty-fourth Congress, and reelected as a Whig to the Twenty-fifth Congress (March 4, 1835 – March 3, 1839); chairman, Committee on Claims (Twenty-fifth Congress).

Chambers represented the counties of Pendleton, Bracken, Robertson, Nicholas and Bourbon.

After Congress
Chambers was appointed Governor of the Iowa Territory in 1841, serving until 1845. He was then appointed commissioner to negotiate a treaty with the Sioux Indians in Minnesota Territory in 1849, and was unsuccessful. He died near Paris, Bourbon County, Kentucky, September 21, 1852, and was interred in the family burial ground at Washington, in Mason County, Kentucky.

Personal life
He married Margaret Taylor (b. May 22, 1781), daughter of Major Ignatius Taylor (1742–1807), on June 16, 1803. She died on March 4, 1807. They had no surviving children.

He married secondly, on October 29, 1807, to Hannah Lee Taylor (January 9, 1791 – November 11, 1832), daughter of Major Ignatius Taylor with his second wife, Barbara Bowie (1756–1805). Hannah was a half-sister to John's first wife Margaret. John and Hannah had twelve children; Margaret Taylor (1808–1863), Joseph Sprigg Taylor, Hannah Lee Taylor, James Taylor, Matilda Taylor, Francis Taylor, Jane Taylor, Mary Taylor, Laura Taylor, John Taylor, James Taylor, Henry Taylor, Lucretia Taylor.

References

External links

1780 births
1852 deaths
People from Somerset County, New Jersey
National Republican Party members of the United States House of Representatives from Kentucky
Whig Party members of the United States House of Representatives from Kentucky
Iowa Whigs
Governors of Iowa Territory
Judges of the Kentucky Court of Appeals
Kentucky lawyers
American slave owners
Politicians from Lexington, Kentucky
People from Washington, Kentucky
19th-century American judges